Spencer's Pilots is an American adventure series that aired on CBS from September 17 to November 19, 1976. Created by Larry Rosen and developed by Alvin Sapinsley, the series stars Gene Evans.

Episode list

References

External links
 

1976 American television series debuts
1976 American television series endings
1970s American drama television series
American adventure television series
Aviation television series
CBS original programming
English-language television shows
Television series by CBS Studios
Television shows set in California